Victor Eugene Wickersham (February 9, 1906 – March 15, 1988) was an American politician and a U.S. Representative from Oklahoma.

Early life and education
Born on a farm near Lone Rock, Arkansas, Wickersham was the son of Frank Morrell and Lillie Mae Sword Wickersham. He moved to Mangum, Oklahoma, with his parents in 1915 and was educated in the public schools of Oklahoma.

Career
Employed in the office of the county clerk of Greer County, Oklahoma from 1924 to 1926, Wickersham was appointed as court clerk of Greer County from 1926 to 1935. On June 30, 1929, he married Jessie Blaine Stiles of Mangum. As the county clerk, he issued his own marriage license. Four children were born to the marriage, LaMelba, Nelda, Galen, and Victor Wickersham II.

Wickersham served as chief clerk of the board of affairs of the State of Oklahoma in 1935 and 1936. He engaged as a building contractor in Oklahoma City in 1937 and 1938 and in the life insurance business 1938-1941. Wickersham also worked as a real estate, insurance, and investment broker.

Congressional tenure
Wickersham was elected as a Democrat to the 77th Congress to fill the vacancy caused by the death of Sam C. Massingale. He was reelected to the 78th and 79th Congresses and served from April 1, 1941, to January 3, 1947.  He was an unsuccessful candidate for renomination in 1946, but was reelected to the 81st and to the three succeeding Congresses (January 3, 1949 – January 3, 1957). He was not renominated in 1956 and 1958. He succeeded in his election to the 87th and to the 88th Congresses (January 3, 1961 – January 3, 1965).  He was an unsuccessful candidate for renomination in 1964 to the 89th Congress.

Wickersham did not sign the 1956 Southern Manifesto, and voted for the Twenty-Fourth Amendment (abolishing the poll tax) in 1962, but voted against the Civil Rights Act of 1964.

State legislature
In 1984 Wickersham's wife, Jessie, died. He married Lorene Dennis in 1986. He served as member of the Oklahoma House of Representatives from January 3, 1971 to January 3, 1979, and again from February 9, 1988, until his death. He was the oldest state legislator in office in 1988 at the age of 82.

Death
Wickersham died in Oklahoma City, Oklahoma County, Oklahoma, on March 15, 1988 (age 82 years, 35 days). He is interred at Riverside Cemetery, Mangum, Oklahoma.

References

External links

Victor E. Wickersham Collection and Photograph Series at the Carl Albert Center
 

1906 births
1988 deaths
People from Baxter County, Arkansas
People from Greer County, Oklahoma
Democratic Party members of the Oklahoma House of Representatives
Democratic Party members of the United States House of Representatives from Oklahoma
People from Mangum, Oklahoma
20th-century American politicians